"All About Us" is a song by British-Australian singer Peter Andre. It was released in July 1997 as the lead single from his third studio album, Time (1997). The album version features Montell Jordan and Lil' Bo Peep. "All About Us" peaked at number three on the UK Singles Chart and also charted in Australia, Flanders, the Netherlands, and New Zealand.

Critical reception
In an album review, Brendan Swift from AllMusic said "the catchy dance of 'All About Us', produced, written and featuring Jordan's backing vocals, sounds like a knockoff from one of his albums (albeit a strong one)" and "among the strongest on Time".

Track listings

UK CD1
 "All About Us" (radio edit) – 3:55
 "All About Us" (Gridlock mix) – 6:25
 "All About Us" (Sole Survivor mix) – 9:30
 "All About Us" (extended version) – 5:00

UK CD2
 "All About Us" (radio edit without rap) – 3:55
 "All About Us" (instrumental) – 4:25
 "All About Us" (T-Total mix) – 6:55
 "All About Us" (acappella) – 4:20

UK cassette single and European CD single
 "All About Us" (radio edit) – 3:55
 "Mystery Track" – 5:13

European maxi-CD single
 "All About Us" (radio edit) – 3:55
 "All About Us" (Gridlock mix) – 6:25
 "All About Us" (Sole Survivor mix) – 9:30
 "All About Us" (extended version) – 5:00
 "All About Us" (T-Total mix) – 6:55
 "All About Us" (radio edit without rap) – 3:55

Australian CD single
 "All About Us" (radio edit without rap) – 3:55
 "All About Us" (Gridlock mix) – 6:25
 "All About Us" (radio edit) – 3:55
 "All About Us" (Sole Survivor mix) – 9:30
 "I Feel You" (acoustic) – 5:38
 "You Are" (unplugged) – 3:45

Charts

References

 

 
1997 songs
1997 singles
Mushroom Records singles
Peter Andre songs
Songs written by Peter Andre